The 2010 BBL Champions Cup was the fifth edition of the super cup game in German basketball, and was played on September 26, 2010. The game was played at the JAKO-Arena in Bamberg.

Match

References

BBL Champions Cup
Champions Cup